Holy Trinity Cathedral, Cathedral of the Holy Trinity or Trinity Cathedral may refer to:

Africa
 Holy Trinity Cathedral (Addis Ababa), Ethiopia
 Holy Trinity Cathedral (Accra), Ghana

Americas

Canada

Holy Trinity Cathedral (New Westminster), British Columbia
Holy Trinity Ukrainian Orthodox Cathedral, Vancouver, British Columbia
Holy Trinity Ukrainian Orthodox Metropolitan Cathedral, Winnipeg, Manitoba
Cathedral of the Holy Trinity (Quebec), Quebec City

Caribbean
 Holy Trinity Cathedral, Port-au-Prince, Haiti
 Holy Trinity Cathedral (Kingston), Jamaica
 Holy Trinity Cathedral, Port of Spain, Trinidad and Tobago

Mexico
 Holy Trinity Cathedral, Autlán

United States

Trinity Cathedral (Phoenix, Arizona)
Holy Trinity Orthodox Cathedral (Chicago), Illinois
Trinity Cathedral (Easton, Maryland)
Cathedral of the Holy Trinity (New Ulm, Minnesota)
Trinity Cathedral (Omaha, Nebraska)
Trinity & St. Philip's Cathedral (Newark, New Jersey)
Archdiocesan Cathedral of the Holy Trinity, New York City
Trinity Cathedral (Cleveland, Ohio)
Trinity Cathedral (Pittsburgh), Pennsylvania
Holy Trinity Cathedral (Salt Lake City, Utah)

Asia

 Holy Trinity Cathedral, Yangon, Burma
 Holy Trinity Church, Shanghai, China
 Holy Trinity Cathedral, Kowloon, Hong Kong
 Holy Trinity Cathedral, Palayamkottai, India
 Trinity Cathedral, Jerusalem, Israel
 Holy Trinity Cathedral, Karachi, Pakistan

Europe

 Cathedral of the Holy Trinity, Bosnia and Herzegovina
 Holy Trinity Cathedral, Ruse, Bulgaria
 Holy Trinity Cathedral, Oulu, Finland
 American Cathedral in Paris, France
 Holy Trinity Cathedral of Tbilisi, Georgia
 Cathedral of the Holy Trinity, Gibraltar
 Holy Trinity Cathedral, Athens, Greece
 Christ Church Cathedral, Dublin (formerly Cathedral of the Holy Trinity), Ireland
 Holy Trinity Cathedral, Riga, Latvia
 Down Cathedral (Cathedral Church of the Holy and Undivided Trinity), Downpatrick, Northern Ireland
 Holy Trinity Cathedral, Arad, Romania
 Holy Trinity Cathedral, Blaj, Romania
 Holy Trinity Cathedral, Gherla, Romania
 Holy Trinity Cathedral, Žilina, Slovakia
 Holy Trinity Cathedral of the Alexander Nevsky Lavra, St. Petersburg, Russia
 Old Trinity Cathedral (demolished), St. Petersburg, Russia
 Trinity Cathedral, Saint Petersburg, Russia
 Trinity Cathedral (Sergiyev Posad), Russia
 Trinity Cathedral, Trubchevsk, Russia
Holy Trinity Cathedral (Niš), Serbia
 Trinity Cathedral, Yekaterinburg
 Holy Trinity Cathedral (Lymanske), Ukraine
 Trinity Cathedral, Kiev, Ukraine

Oceania
 Holy Trinity Cathedral, Wangaratta, Victoria, Australia
 Holy Trinity Cathedral, Auckland, New Zealand

See also
The Cathedral Church of the Holy and Undivided Trinity (disambiguation)
Holy Trinity Church (disambiguation)
Trinity Episcopal Cathedral (disambiguation)
Most Holy Trinity Cathedral